Hoàng Nhật Nam (born 3 April 1990) is a Vietnamese footballer who played as an attacking midfielder for Sanna Khánh Hòa BVN. He is the twin brother of Hoàng Danh Ngọc, with whom he was teammate at Nam Dinh.

Club career

Ho Chi Minh City
Nam signed with Ho Chi Minh City in January 2016.

References 

1990 births
Living people
People from Thái Bình province
Vietnamese footballers
Association football midfielders
Nam Định F.C. players
Ho Chi Minh City FC players
Khanh Hoa FC players